Groves High School (Wylie E. Groves High School or Groves) is a public, magnet high school in Beverly Hills, Michigan, United States, in the Birmingham Public School District.  Groves' colors are green, white, and yellow and its mascot is Freddy the Falcon. The current principal is Dr. Susan Smith.

The French School of Detroit holds its high school classes at Groves High School.

History

Name 
In 1951, a new high school in Birmingham opened under the name Birmingham High School (which is now known as Seaholm High School). At the time, the president of the Board of Education was Ernest W. Seaholm and the treasurer was Wylie E. Groves. When Birmingham had to build another school to accommodate the incoming baby boomers, these men's names became the source of the modern names of Birmingham's two main high schools: Seaholm High School and Groves High School.

Building history 

Completed in 1959, the building was an example of the International Style applied to school design, resulting in a modernistic exterior look. The building's original architectural "signature" was a scalloped circular white roof over the circular library; now painted black, it is visible but no longer prominent.

Early years 
The school opened in the fall of 1959 with 1,052 students in grades seven through ten. Intended eventually to be Birmingham's second high school, it was named after a local civic leader and school board member. The original tenth graders became the first class of graduating seniors in 1962. For a brief period the school was a junior and senior high school, and the classes of 1965, 1966 and 1967 spent grades seven through twelve there. Beginning with the 1963–64 school year, grades seven and eight were moved from Groves to Berkshire Middle School, which today serves grades six through eight in the Birmingham City School District.  The lower grades were eliminated as new junior high schools were built. This pattern enabled the school district to accommodate, with phased construction, the demographic wave of babyboomers emerging from elementary schools in the late 1950s and 1960s.

Academics 

The school offers numerous Honors and Advanced Placement courses for students to elect. Advanced Placement is offered for Biology, Chemistry, Physics, Calculus AB, Calculus BC, Computer Science, Economics, English Language, English Literature, Environmental Science, European History, French, Music Theory, Psychology, Spanish, Statistics, US History, and US Government. The school has a variety of academic elective options for students who do not wish to take Honors or AP courses. The school also offers many courses in journalism, with the newspaper- "The Scriptor", the yearbook- "The Talon", and the television production- "The Fann (Falcon Action News Network)"

Athletics and activities 
The school offers over 30 varsity sports for both men and women.  Most sports are broken down into varsity, junior varsity, and freshmen teams. Groves is a member of the Oakland Activities Association and has won league championships in nearly every sport since the league's inception in 1994.

In soccer, Jordan Gruber set the Michigan State High School goal-scoring record with 69 goals as a senior.

Groves also offers a variety of activities for students to participate in, including instrumental music (both band and orchestra), forensics team, eco club, interact club, fashion club, Amnesty and Animal Rights club, Gay-Straight Alliance club, Japanese club, Spanish club, French club, debate team, theatre, quiz bowl, bowling club, photography club, and the National Honor Society. Both the forensics and debate teams have enjoyed success in recent years. The forensics team finished second in the state in 2007, while the debate team finished first in 2006, 2007, 2008, 2009 and 2010.

Groves Student Congress (GSC) is responsible for planning school-wide activities and events such as Spirit Week, Field Day, Extreme Dodgeball, Operation Volleyball, Sadie Hawkins Dance, Wylie's Winter Week, and two blood drives. Members of GSC are elected in school-wide elections. In addition, each class elects its own government, which is responsible for planning class-wide events. Groves students also run their own events independent of the school, including the seniors-only "Water Wars" tournament at the end of the year.

State championships 

* Birmingham Unified is a combined team of Groves and Seaholm students

Notable alumni 

Leigh Taylor-Young, 1962, actress
 Jeff Teague, 1975, automotive designer
 C. Mark Jordan, 1975, automotive designer
 Bruce Campbell, 1976, movie actor
 Sam Raimi, 1976, movie director
 Jennifer Laura Thompson, 1987, Tony-nominated Broadway actress
Raymond Kethledge, 1985, judge, United States Court of Appeals for the Sixth Circuit
 Jeff Katz, 1997, movie producer and broadcaster
Jordan Gruber (born 1983), American-Israeli soccer player
 Jason Polan, 2000, artist
 Meryl Davis, 2005, Olympic medalist ice dancer
 Mike Posner, 2006, singer and pop star
 Grant Kwiecinski,  2008, also known by his stage name GRiZ, DJ and electronic music producer
Annie Lazor, 2012, Olympic bronze medalist and swimmer
Matthew Lucas, 2014, also known by his stage name Peekaboo (musician), American dubstep producer
 Anthony Pittman, 2014, American Football Linebacker for the Detroit Lions of the National Football League
 Ben Agosto, Olympic medalist ice dancer
 Erin Dilly, Tony-nominated Broadway actress
 Jeremy Moss, state senator
 Bruce Ableson, social media pioneer

See also
International Academy

References

External links
 

Public high schools in Michigan
Educational institutions established in 1959
High schools in Oakland County, Michigan
1959 establishments in Michigan